The Capernwray Missionary Fellowship of Torchbearers (CMFOT), is an evangelical Christian educational organisation based at Capernwray Hall in north Lancashire, England. In 1998 the organisation was incorporated as a UK charitable company.

CMFOT was founded by Major W. Ian Thomas in 1947. Other centres have since been established around the world and together form a worldwide fellowship known as Torchbearers International, with headquarters at Ravencrest Chalet, Estes Park, Colorado, USA.

Torchbearers International's goal is to provide practical Christian education to develop personal spiritual growth, prepare people for an effective Church life, and teach a working knowledge of the Bible. The organization works by providing a number of Bible schools and Christian conference centres on the world.

CMFOT's founder, Major W. Ian Thomas (1914–2007), was an evangelical teacher and has often been identified with the Keswick Convention ministry. The main thrust of his theology is that of the exchanged life or 'Christ in You'. Major Thomas' sons have continued from their father in the wider organisation. Mark Thomas was the managing director at Capernwray Hall, Chris Thomas was the International Director and Director at Ravencrest, Colorado, United States and Peter Thomas is director at Capernwray New Zealand and Moss Vale, Australia.

Capernwray Bible School 
Capernwray was first used as a Bible School in Autumn 1947, to meet a demand for Bible teaching from the many new converts from holiday conferences held at the Hall. The school has matured and grown over the years and now has intakes each Winter and Spring, to a capacity of around 190 students, from sometimes as many as 30 different nations. During the Summer, Easter and Christmas breaks the facilities are used for Christian conferences and holidays.

Capernwray Holidays 
Capernwray initially started off as a Christian holiday centre and this activity continues to be a vital part of the ministry today. The holidays currently on offer cater for a mixed age range of young people, families and a cross-section of adults. Guests come from around the United Kingdom and from overseas, including many from Germany, still maintaining a link that goes back more than 60 years.

Theology 

The history of Torchbearers can be traced back to brokenness when Major W. Ian Thomas came to the end of himself in his own effort to please God. It was right at that point where Christ began to produce what has become a fellowship of like-minded people who have also discovered that the only One who is able to produce true godliness is God Himself. The Torchbearers centres, which are now scattered around the world, are merely a testimony to the risen Christ bringing into being that which otherwise could not have been. They are international and interdenominational by nature, and deeply appreciate the freedom to keep the person of Christ at the centre of their teaching and fellowship, instead of the things which too often divide.

References

External links

City of Lancaster
Christianity in Lancashire
Evangelicalism in the United Kingdom